Harrisonia abyssinica is a species of shrub or small tree in the genus Harrisonia, family Rutaceae. Native to tropical Africa, its habitat is usually in transitional zones between deciduous woodlands and evergreen forest.

Description
It flowers from August to November with white to yellow petals. The fruits are red to black,  in diameter and edible.

Medicinal properties
The roots and bark from the stem are used to treat gonorrhoea, dysentery and tuberculosis as well as an ascaricide.

References

Trees of Africa
Cneoroideae
Taxa named by Daniel Oliver